Digitoxigenin, a cardenolide, is the aglycone of digitoxin.

Digitoxigenin can be used to prepare actodigin.

In Lednicer's book on steroids, it is made from deoxycholic acid.

References

Cardenolides
Diols